Ontarjatra (Homeland) is a 2006 Bangladeshi drama film directed by Tareque Masud and Catherine Masud. Upon its release on 2006, the film achieved critical and commercial success. It won for Best Direction at International Film Festival Bangladesh in 2006. Special Jury Award at Osian's Cinefan Festival Delhi in 2006.

Synopsis
Ontorjatra (literally meaning "inner journey") is a Bengali intimate exploration of the complex issues of dislocation and identity in a diasporic world. After 15 years in the UK, Shireen and her son Sohel return to their home in Sylhet, Bangladesh for the funeral of Sohel's father. For Shireen the homecoming allows her to make peace with her ex-husband and his family, for Sohel, the journey allows him to connect with a family and a "homeland" he has never known.

Cast
 Sara Zaker as Shireen
 Jayanto Chattopadhyay as Iqbal
 Rifaquat Rasheed as Sohail
 Abdul Momen Choudhury as Grandfather 
 Rokeya Prachy as Salma
 Harold Rasheed as Khaled
 Nasrine R. Karim as Najma
 Raisa Nawar as Rini
 Lakkhan Das as Lakkhan
 Ria Ahmed as Bithi

Guest appearances
 Anusheh Anadil
 Buno

References

Further reading
Lonely Planet Bangladesh
Bangladesh by Mikey Leung, Belinda Meggitt
Osian's Cinemaya (Volume 1)
Atlas del cine - Page 413

External links

2006 films
2006 drama films
Bengali-language Bangladeshi films
Bangladeshi drama films
British Bangladeshi films
2000s English-language films
Films directed by Tareque Masud
Films directed by Catherine Masud
2000s Bengali-language films
2006 multilingual films
Bangladeshi multilingual films